During the 2011–12 English football season, Brentford competed in Football League One. In a season of transition under new manager Uwe Rösler, the Bees finished in 9th place.

Season summary 

After guiding Brentford away from the League One relegation zone and securing a mid-table finish at the end of the 2010–11 season, Nicky Forster was passed over for the full-time manager's job in favour of Uwe Rösler. Rösler's appointment was part of an overhaul behind the scenes at Griffin Park, with Forster's first team coach Mark Warburton retained by the club and installed in the newly created role of sporting director. Medical and analysis teams were added to the backroom staff and a Development Squad was introduced to replace the reserve team. Manager Rösler brought in six new players before the beginning of the season – defenders Marcel Eger and Shay Logan, midfielders Jonathan Douglas and Harry Forrester, loan winger Niall McGinn and forward Clayton Donaldson. Two more players would arrive before the end of the summer transfer window, defender Adam Thompson and forward Mike Grella. Grella was a late replacement for Charlie MacDonald, who transferred to Milton Keynes Dons.

Despite falling at the first hurdle to League Two club Hereford United in the first round of the League Cup, Brentford enjoyed a strong start to the league season, winning five of the opening seven matches to climb as high as 4th place. By the end of 2011, the Bees were on the edge of the playoff places and had exited all the cup competitions, having been knocked out of the FA Cup and Football League Trophy at the second round and Southern Area semi-final stages respectively. Manager Uwe Rösler spent much of the first half of the season overhauling the squad, loaning out Pim Balkestein, Ryan Blake, Michael Spillane and Sam Wood, with six loan players arriving between 8 September and 24 November as cover during an injury crisis. Leading goalscorer Gary Alexander was loaned out for the final two months of the season.

Just 3 wins from a 16-match spell between 17 December 2011 and 20 March 2012 dropped Brentford back into mid-table and though the team finished the season strongly (winning six and drawing two of the final 9 matches), too many dropped points at home saw the Bees finish in 9th place, six points below the playoff zone. The season had proved to be one of transition and manager Uwe Rösler's loan signings of left back Jake Bidwell, centre back Harlee Dean and midfielder Adam Forshaw proved to be shrewd, with the trio returning for the 2012–13 season (Bidwell on loan, Dean and Forshaw on permanent transfers) and the youngsters would play a major part in Brentford's future success. Teenage Development Squad midfielder Jake Reeves was blooded during the season and was described as "a big option" by Rösler.

League table

Results

Pre-season friendlies

League One

Results by round

Results summary

Results

FA Cup

Football League Cup

Football League Trophy

 Sources: Statto, brentfordfc.co.uk, brentfordfc.co.uk

Playing squad 
Players' ages are as of the opening day of the 2011–12 season.

 Source: Soccerbase

Coaching staff

Statistics

Appearances and goals
Substitute appearances in brackets.

 Players listed in italics left the club mid-season.
 Source: Soccerbase

Goalscorers 

 Players listed in italics left the club mid-season.
 Source: Soccerbase

Discipline 

 Players listed in italics left the club mid-season.
 Source: ESPN FC

International caps

Management

Summary

Transfers & loans

Kit 

|
|

Development Squad

Playing squad 
Players' ages are as of the opening day of the 2011–12 senior season.

 Source: brentfordfc.co.uk

Summary 

 Source: brentfordfc.co.uk

Awards
 Supporters' Player of the Year: Jonathan Douglas
 Community Player of the Year: Marcus Bean
 Football League Family Excellence Award

References

Brentford F.C. seasons
Brentford